Josh Campbell is the name of:

Josh Campbell (soccer), United States former footballer
Josh Campbell (footballer), Scottish footballer
Josh Campbell (journalist), American journalist